Janusz Karweta (born March 20, 1988 in Oświęcim, Poland) is a Polish former competitive pair skater. He competed with Krystyna Klimczak. They are the 2007 Polish national silver medalists. They have competed internationally on the junior level at both Junior Grand Prix events and at the World Junior Figure Skating Championships and received the host wildcard entry to the 2007-2008 Junior Grand Prix Final, where they placed 9th. He also competed as a singles skater at the national level.

Although they placed ninth on the day, they were later moved up a spot to an eighth-place finish at the 2007-2008 Junior Grand Prix Final following the retroactive disqualification of first-place-finishers Vera Bazarova & Yuri Larionov due to a positive doping sample from Larionov.

Competitive highlights

Pairs career
(with Klimczak)

 J = Junior level

Singles career

 N = Novice level; J = Junior level

References

External links
 

Polish male pair skaters
1988 births
Living people
People from Oświęcim
Sportspeople from Lesser Poland Voivodeship